"Losing My Mind" is a song written by Stephen Sondheim originally for the 1971 musical Follies for the character of a former showgirl, Sally Durant Plummer. The song became a popular top ten hit for singer and actress Liza Minnelli in 1989 on the UK Singles Chart and in Europe. "Losing My Mind" has been covered by many artists over the years.

Follies

Background
"Losing My Mind" was first performed by Dorothy Collins in the role of Sally Durant Plummer in the original Broadway production of Follies. Other performers who have sung the song in later productions of Follies include Barbara Cook (1985), Julia McKenzie (1987), Donna McKechnie (1998), Judith Ivey (2001), Victoria Clark (2007),Bernadette Peters (2011) and Imelda Staunton (2017).

The song was written as a torch song for the character of Sally to sing in the "Loveland" portion of the musical. The song "expresses her preoccupation with Ben, her idealized lover...With infinite attention to detail, Sondheim leads Sally from sunrise to sleepless night, revealing that every second of her existence is defined by her longing...the number ...explores the extent to which she has lost herself in this make-believe world of undying desire." As originally staged, Sally comes onstage in a "clinging, beaded silver" dress, holding a microphone. The "cute" Sally from Phoenix "has become a languid torch singer." She repeats her lines, reflecting "the paralysis about which she sings...the phrase 'It's like I'm losing my mind' occurs no less than six times."

In the first literary resume of his career, Finishing the Hat, Sondheim reveals that the song is a pastiche of George and Ira Gershwin's "The Man I Love".

Liza Minnelli version

Background
In the UK Singles Chart, the most successful version has been by American singer and actress Liza Minnelli, reaching number six. In Ireland, Minnelli's version reached number two. It was the lead single from her 1989 studio album, Results, produced by Pet Shop Boys and Julian Mendelsohn. The 12" release peaked at number eleven on the Billboard Maxi Singles Sales chart. It also peaked at number twenty-six on the American dance chart.

The Pet Shop Boys demo version of "Losing My Mind" (which has Neil Tennant singing the vocal) was later remixed and released as a B-side on the Pet Shop Boys' single, "Jealousy". This demo version contains a scream that Minnelli opted not to include on her release. The Pet Shop Boys also performed the song as part of their 2022 tours Dreamworld in Europe and Unity Tour (with New Order) in the United States.

Critical reception
David Giles from Music Week constated that Minnelli is "brought back to life" by the Pet Shop Boys on the track. Edwin J. Bernard from Number One described the singer's cover version of "Losing My Mind" as "high energy". Joe Brown from The Washington Post wrote, "Minnelli utterly misses the song's irony and delicacy, playing it instead as if she's literally going nuts, complete with a mid-song electronic freak-out fugue and a spoken soliloquy, guaranteed to raise a camp clamor on the dance floor."

Track listings
 7" Epic / ZEE 1 (UK) 
 "Losing My Mind" (7" mix) – 4:09
 "Tonight Is Forever" – 5:03
* also released on MC (ZEE M1)

 12" Epic / ZEE T1 (UK)
 "Losing My Mind" (extended mix) – 7:01
 "Losing My Mind" (7" mix) – 4:09
 "Tonight Is Forever" – 5:03
* also available on CD (ZEE C1)

 12" Epic / 49-68858 (US)
 "Losing My Mind" (extended remix) – 7:01
 "Losing My Mind" (7" mix) – 4:09
 "Losing My Mind" (Ultimix) – 7:32
 "Losing My Mind" (Ultimix dub) – 5:07

Charts

See also
 List of performances on Top of the Pops

References

External links
"Recordings of Songs, 'Losing My Mind' ", SondheimGuide.com

1971 songs
1989 singles
Torch songs
Shirley Bassey songs
Liza Minnelli songs
Songs from musicals
Songs written by Stephen Sondheim
Song recordings produced by Julian Mendelsohn